Teodora Dimoska (born 29 September 2000) is a Macedonian footballer who plays as a forward for 1. liga club ŽFK Tiverija Istatov and the North Macedonia women's national team.

References

2000 births
Living people
Women's association football forwards
Macedonian women's footballers
North Macedonia women's international footballers